Striped blenny is a common name for several fishes and may refer to:

Aspidontus taeniatus, native to the western Pacific and eastern Indian Oceans
Chasmodes bosquianus, native to the northwestern Atlantic Ocean
Ecsenius lineatus, native to the Indian and southwestern Pacific Oceans
Meiacanthus grammistes, native to the southwestern Pacific Ocean